Aleílson Sousa Rabelo (born December 3, 1985) is a Brazilian association footballer. He was an attacking midfielder for Paragominas football club.

Career statistics

(Correct )

Honours

Águia de Marabá
Campeonato Paraense: 2008

Olaria
Torneio Moisés Mathias de Andrade: 2010

External links
 ogol
 soccerway
 Aleílson at Footballzz

1985 births
Living people
Brazilian footballers
CR Flamengo footballers
Red Bull Brasil players
Águia de Marabá Futebol Clube players
Association football forwards
People from Marabá
Sportspeople from Pará